Kevin Garcia Maldonado (born October 22, 1996) is a Puerto Rican male acrobatic gymnast. Along with his partner, Christian Morales, he competed in the 2014 Acrobatic Gymnastics World Championships.

References

External links

1996 births
Living people
People from Toa Baja, Puerto Rico
Puerto Rican acrobatic gymnasts
Male acrobatic gymnasts